Jozef Israëls (27 January 1824 – 12 August 1911) was a Dutch painter. He was a leading member of the group of landscape painters referred to as the Hague School and, during his lifetime, "the most respected Dutch artist of the second half of the nineteenth century."

Youth
He was born in Groningen, of Jewish parents. His father, Hartog Abraham Israëls, intended for him to be a businessman, and it was only after a determined struggle that he was allowed to embark on an artistic career. He studied initially from 1835 to 1842 at the Minerva Academy in his home town Groningen.

He continued his studies subsequently in Amsterdam, studying at the Royal Academy for Fine Arts which later became the State Academy for Fine Arts in Amsterdam. He was a pupil of Jan Kruseman and attended the drawing class at the academy.  From September 1845 until May 1847 he was in Paris, working in the history painter Picot's studio and taking classes at the Ecole des Beaux-Arts under James Pradier, Horace Vernet and Paul Delaroche. He returned to Amsterdam in September 1845 where he resumed his studies at the Academy until May 1847. Israels remained in Amsterdam until 1870, when he moved to The Hague and became a leading member of the Hague School of landscape painters.

He married Aleida Schaap and the couple had two children, a daughter Mathilde Anna Israëls and a son, Isaac Lazarus Israëls, born in Amsterdam 3 February 1865, who also became a fine art painter.

Sensibility

Israëls has often been compared to Jean-François Millet. As artists, even more than as painters in the strict sense of the word, they both, in fact, saw in the life of the poor and humble a motive for expressing with peculiar intensity their wide human sympathy; but Millet was the poet of placid rural life, while in almost all Israëls' pictures there is some piercing note of woe. Edmond Duranty said of them that they were painted with gloom and suffering.

He began with historical and dramatic subjects in the romantic style of the day. By chance, after an illness, he went to recuperate his strength at the fishing-town of Zandvoort near Haarlem, and there he was struck by the daily tragedy of life. Thenceforth he was possessed by a new vein of artistic expression, sincerely realistic, full of emotion and pity.

Among his more important subsequent works are The Zandvoort Fisherman (in the Amsterdam Gallery), The Silent House (which gained a gold medal at the Brussels Salon, 1858) and Village Poor (a prize at Manchester).

In 1862, he achieved great success in London with his The Shipwrecked Mariner, purchased by Mr Young, and The Cradle, two pictures that the Athenaeum magazine described as the most touching pictures of the exhibition.
A portrait of Jozef Israëls was painted by the Scottish painter George Paul Chalmers .

Honours 
1886: Officer in the Order of Leopold.

Later work
His later works include The Widower (in the Mesdag collection), When we grow Old, Peasant Family at the Table and Alone in the World (Van Gogh Museum / Amsterdam Gallery), An Interior (Dordrecht Gallery), A Frugal Meal (Glasgow museum), Toilers of the Sea, Speechless Dialogue, Between the Fields and the Seashore, The Bric-a-brac Seller (which gained medals of honor at the great Paris Exhibition of 1900).

David Singing before Saul, one of his later works, seems to hint at a return on the part of the venerable artist to the Rembrandtesque note of his youth. As a watercolour painter and etcher he produced a vast number of works, which, like his oil paintings, are full of deep feeling. They are generally treated in broad masses of light and shade, which give prominence to the principal subject without any neglect of detail. Israëls probably influenced many other painters and one them was the Scottish painter Robert McGregor (1847-1922).

References

Attribution

Bibliography
Jan Veth, Mannen of Betekenis: Jozef Israëls
Chesneau, Peintres français et étrangers
Philippe Zilcken, Peintres hollandais modernes (1893)
Dumas, Illustrated Biographies of Modern Artists (1882–1884)
J. de Meester, in Max Roose's Dutch Painters of the Nineteenth Century (1898)
Jozef Israëls, Spain: the Story of a Journey (1900).

External links

 
  
 Hecht Museum
 Virtual Scotland
  BBC
 Genealogy Israels
 Biographical notes and dates of Jozef Isräels, in the Dutch R.K.D. Archive
 Free images of the art of Jozef Isräels, in the Rijksmuseum, Amsterdam
 Video of the artist's paintings

1824 births
1911 deaths
Dutch Jews
19th-century Dutch painters
Dutch male painters
Jewish painters
Painters from Groningen
Painters from Amsterdam
Hague School
20th-century Dutch painters
Honorary Members of the Royal Academy
19th-century Dutch male artists
20th-century Dutch male artists